Unfried is an extinct town in Garfield County, in the U.S. state of Washington.

A post office called Unfried was established in 1910, and remained in operation until 1917. The community bears the name of an early postmaster.

References

Ghost towns in Garfield County, Washington
Geography of Garfield County, Washington